Mount Karpinsky, or Karpinsky Mountain, is a peak in the circumpolar part of the Ural Mountains.  It is part of the Research Range, and lies on the boundary between the Komi Republic and the Tyumen Oblast. Rising to a height of 1878 m, it is composed of quartzites and crystalline schists. The slopes are predominantly mountain tundra, but there are coniferous forests in the foothills. Mount Karpinsky was named for the geologist Aleksandr Petrovich Karpinsky.

See also
 List of highest points of Russian federal subjects

References

Karpinsky
Ural Mountains
Landforms of Tyumen Oblast